Grey McLeish (27 April 1915 – 20 June 1957) was a Canadian rower. He competed in the men's eight event at the 1936 Summer Olympics.

References

1915 births
1957 deaths
Canadian male rowers
Olympic rowers of Canada
Rowers at the 1936 Summer Olympics
Rowers from Toronto